Mary Dillon (born 1964) is an Irish folk singer from Northern Ireland, known for her work with the traditional band Déanta. She launched her solo career in 2010 with the release of an EP entitled Army Dreamers. She is the sister of singer Cara Dillon.

Early life

Mary Dillon was born in Dungiven, where she still lives with her two children, a son and a daughter. She was raised in a musical household and one of her five siblings is fellow folk singer Cara Dillon. She has never pursued singing as a full-time career and currently works as an English teacher at St Cecilia's College in Derry.

Music career

Mary Dillon started singing at an early age and by her mid-teens, she had twice won the All Ireland Singing Competition at Fleadh Cheoil na hÉireann.

In the 1990s, she recorded three albums with the Irish traditional band Déanta.

In 2010, she released a digital-only EP containing covers of Army Dreamers by Kate Bush, Undone in Sorrow by Ola Belle Reed and Streets of Philadelphia by Bruce Springsteen.

In 2012, she joined fellow Irish folk singers Niamh Parsons and Tíona McSherry to form an a cappella group called Sí Van.

Discography

Solo 
 Army Dreamers (EP) (2010)
 North (Album) (2013)

As a member of Déanta 
 Déanta (1993)
 Ready for the Storm (1994)
 Whisper of a Secret (1997)

Collaborations and guest appearances 
 Cara Dillon – Cara Dillon (2001)
 Cara Dillon – Sweet Liberty (2003)
 Eamon Friel – Waltz of the Years (2003)
 Various Artists – Boys of the Island (2005)
 Cara Dillon – After the Morning (2006)
 Cara Dillon – The Redcastle Sessions (2008)
 Eamon Friel – Smarter (2009)
 Sullem Voe – All Naked Flames (2009)
 Krista Detor – Barely (2015)

Notes and references

External links 
 

1964 births
Living people
Folk musicians from Northern Ireland
Women singers from Northern Ireland
People from Dungiven
Musicians from County Londonderry